Rikki Jai (born Samraj Jaimungal) is an Indo-Trinidadian chutney and chutney-soca musician.

Career
Jai's 1988 debut single Sumintra told the tale of an Indo-Trinidadian woman from Debe who informed her boyfriend of her preference for soca over the music of Indian artist Lata Mangeshkar. Jai returned the following year with Pumping, then Bolo and Show Me Yuh Motion. His 1993 song Wine on a Bumsee signalled Jai's exit from the soca world, opting for the chutney soca arena, in which he continues to perform. Jai released Chutney Vibrations, a compilation with soca chutney rhythms and his re-reading of the Juma.
His most commercially successful release is Mor Tor featuring fellow Trinidadian soca star Machel Montano. In 2007 he released songs such as Aj Bhi Jeen and Bodi ke Dal, followed by Barman. Jai has won Chutney Soca Monarch a record-breaking six times. In 2011, he won his 6th title with the song White Oak and Water. Jai was also crowned for the 7th time when he teamed up with Ravi B.

In 2001, he tied for first place (with Bunji Garlin) for the "Young King" title and placed second in 2010's "Chutney Soca Monarch".

He was crowned champion at the 2011 Chutney Soca Monarch, and walked away with TT$2 million in prize money.

References

20th-century Trinidad and Tobago male singers
20th-century Trinidad and Tobago singers
Chutney musicians
Trinidad and Tobago people of Indian descent
Living people
Year of birth missing (living people)
People from San Fernando, Trinidad and Tobago
21st-century Trinidad and Tobago male singers
21st-century Trinidad and Tobago singers